Sinemart Indonesia (SinemArt) is an Indonesian production house founded on 3 March 2003 by Leo Sutanto, Sentot Sahid, Heru Hendriarto, and Lala Hamid. It initially focused on producing soap operas and films. His first work is entitled Malam Pertama, soap operas that aired on SCTV. This first soap opera has won many nominations in the event SCTV Awards in 2003. 

Formerly a member of MNC Media, SinemArt is currently owned by Surya Citra Media.

Former subsidiary 
 Lenza Film (2003—2005, consolidated to SinemArt)
 Pop Soaps Productions (2005—2005, consolidated to SinemArt)

References

External links 
 
 
 

Companies based in Jakarta
Entertainment companies established in 2003
Mass media companies established in 2003
Film production companies of Indonesia
Elang Mahkota Teknologi